Eucalyptus radiata, commonly known as the narrow-leaved peppermint or Forth River peppermint, is a species of tree that is endemic to south-eastern Australia. It has rough, fibrous to flaky bark on the trunk and larger branches, smooth grey bark on the thinner branches, lance-shaped to curved or almost linear leaves, flower buds in groups of eleven to twenty or more, white flowers and cup-shaped, hemispherical or shortened spherical fruit.

Description
The buds are small and very numerous (8-16 per cluster). Flowering occurs from October to January and the flowers are white.

Taxonomy
Eucalyptus radiata was first formally described in 1828 by Augustin Pyramus de Candolle in his book Prodromus Systematis Naturalis Regni Vegetabilis, from an unpublished description by Franz Sieber.

In 1927, William Blakely described Eucalyptus robertsonii in Journal and Proceedings of the Royal Society of New South Wales. In 1973, Lawrie Johnson and Donald Frederick Blaxell reduced it to a subspecies of Eucalyptus radiata, describing both the new subspecies and the autonym, subspecies radiata in Contributions from the New South Wales Herbarium. The names of the two subspecies are accepted by the Australian Plant Census:
 Eucalyptus radiata Sieber ex DC. subsp. radiata has adult glossy green leaves, new growth and flower buds that are not glaucous and an operculum that is conical;
 Eucalyptus radiata subsp. robertsonii (Blakely) L.A.S.Johnson & Blaxell has adult greyish green leaves, glaucous buds and an operculum sharply conical. Seedling stems are also glaucous.<ref name="RBGV2">{{cite web |last1=Messina |first1=Andre |last2=Stajsic |first2=Val |title=Eucalyptus radiata subsp. robertsonii' |url=https://vicflora.rbg.vic.gov.au/flora/taxon/048cc090-cca3-4c65-acf1-1ec833caa147 |publisher=Royal Botanic Gardens Victoria |access-date=9 December 2019}}</ref>

Distribution and habitat
Narrow-leaved peppermint grows in forest and woodland, usually in cooler or wetter habitats. It occurs in New South Wales south from near the Queensland border, in the Australian Capital Territory, to the Wombat State Forest, Great Otway National Park and ranges of South Gippsland in Victoria. It also occurs in Tasmania where it is restricted to the catchment of the Forth River. Subspecies robertsonii is restricted to montane and subalpine forests of north-eastern Victoria.

UsesEucalyptus radiata has six known chemotypes of essential oil. The leaves are distilled for cineole and phellandrene based eucalyptus oils. E.radiata was the first eucalyptus species to be commercially utilized for oil by  Melbourne pharmacist, Joseph Bosisto, in 1854 as "Eucalyptus amygdalina"''.

Gallery

References

radiata
Myrtales of Australia
Trees of Australia
Flora of the Australian Capital Territory
Flora of New South Wales
Flora of Queensland
Flora of Tasmania
Flora of Victoria (Australia)
Crops originating from Australia